Jürgen von Rosenstiel (23 November 1912 – 6 July 1942) was a German U-boat commander in World War II.

Naval career
Jürgen von Rosenstiel joined the Reichsmarine on 1 April 1933. During his training he sailed on ships such as the Gorch Fock and then the cruiser Karlsruhe (taking part in a 239-day world trip in 1933 and again 55 days in Spanish waters in 1936–1937, where they joined the non-intervention patrols off the Spanish coast during the Spanish Civil War). Lastly he sailed on the school ship  from October 1938 to March 1939. He then joined the school ship in an official capacity, serving as radio technical officer and a watch officer on the Schlesien from July 1939 to March 1940 when he was then transferred to the U-boat force.
From April to August 1940 Rosenstiel went through U-boat training and then joined the 2nd U-boat Flotilla as a supernumerary watch officer until September 1940.

In preparation of taking command of a new boat Rosenstiel went through U-boat familiarization at Deutsche Werft, Hamburg from 17 April 1941. On 31 May 1941 Rosenstiel commissioned the new Type IXC boat  at Hamburg. He spent the next four months in the Baltic training his crew and preparing the boat for combat. On 29 September 1941 he took the boat out on its first of three war patrols. Rosenstiel would be very successful sinking 14 ships and damaging two more ships. He achieved his greatest successes with U-502 in the Caribbean. On the return leg of her third patrol, U-502 was sunk with all hands by a British Wellington bomber in the Bay of Biscay.

Awards
Spanish Cross in Silver without Swords - 6 June 1939
Iron Cross 2nd Class - 5 November 1940
U-boat War Badge 1939 - 22 January 1941
Iron Cross 1st Class - 17 March 1942

References

Bibliography

1912 births
1942 deaths
U-boat commanders (Kriegsmarine)
German military personnel of the Spanish Civil War
Recipients of the Iron Cross (1939), 1st class
Reichsmarine personnel
Kriegsmarine personnel killed in World War II
People lost at sea
Deaths by airstrike during World War II
Military personnel from Kiel